Abbotsford is a suburb in the Inner West of Sydney, in the state of New South Wales, Australia. Abbotsford is 10 kilometres west of the Sydney central business district in the local government area of the City of Canada Bay. Abbotsford sits on the peninsula between Abbotsford Bay and Hen and Chicken Bay, on the Parramatta River.

History
Abbotsford took its name from Abbotsford House, owned by Sir Arthur Renwick. He named his property after Abbotsford House in Scotland, the residence of historical novelist and poet, Sir Walter Scott.

Aboriginal culture
Abbotsford was first known by its Aboriginal name Bigi Bigi. The traditional owners are the Wangal clan of the Eora Nation.

European settlement
The suburb was originally part of Five Dock Farm and when subdivided in 1837, was called Feltham. Sir Arthur Renwick, a doctor, philanthropist and politician built his home here in 1890 and called it Abbotsford House in honour of Sir Walter Scott's home. Renwick sold his property in 1903 to Albert Grace, and in 1918 it became the site of a Nestlé chocolate factory, with the house used initially for chocolate production and later as their administrative offices. The factory was closed in 1991, after which the area was redeveloped as the medium-density Abbotsford Cove housing complex.

Australian poet Henry Lawson did not die in Abbotsford house in 1922, as is sometimes claimed, but at the home of Mrs Isabella Byers at 437 Great North Road, recently demolished. Abbotsford House is now listed on the Register of the National Estate.

Demographics
The most common countries of birth were Italy 5.5%, England 3.4% and China 3.1%. 66.0% of people only spoke English at home. Other languages spoken at home included Italian 9.0%, Mandarin 3.0%, Cantonese 2.2% and Greek 2.1%. The most common responses for religious affiliation were Catholic 38.6%, No Religion 23.7% and Anglican 10.2%.

Transport
Transit Systems bus route 438 operates from Abbotsford ferry wharf to Martin Place. Abbotsford ferry wharf is served by Parramatta River ferry services. Electric trams operated to Abbotsford until their replacement by buses in 1954.

Commercial area
Abbotsford has a small group of shops on Great North Road.

Education
Abbotsford Public School is a local primary school at 350 Great North Road.

Landmarks

Sport and recreation
Abbotsford Sailing Club and Sydney Rowing Club sit on the Parramatta River, at the end of Great North Road. Abbotsford houses the rowing sheds for Sydney Boys High School, Newington College and Abbotsford Rowing Club.

Notable residents
 David Hicks
 Reg Latta
 Henry Lawson 
 Lewy Pattinson 
 Sir Arthur Renwick

References

Suburbs of Sydney
City of Canada Bay